is an archeological site  with the ruins of a Hakuhō period Buddhist temple located in the Kokufucho neighborhood of the city of   Tottori, Tottori prefecture,  in the San'in region of Japan. The foundations of its Japanese pagodas were designated as a National Historic Site in 1935, and the designation expanded to cover the remaining temple ruins in 2004

History
The Tochimoto ruins are located on the right bank of the Oishi River, a tributary of the Fukuro River. The temple is unique in the San'in region as its layout was patterned after Yakushi-ji in Nara, with twin pagodas constructed side-by-side. The pagoda foundation stones with pillar holes and reliquary holes are separated by about 27.4 meters.  During a four-year archaeological excavation from 1997 revealed that the South Pagoda and Kondo Hall are lined up north to south, the Lecture Hall to the north of them is slightly shifted to the west, and the East Pagoda is located on the east side of the Kondo Hall. The Kondo was a 5 x 4 bay structure measuring 14.8 x 12.4 meters. The Lecture Hall was also 5 x 4 bays, but slightly larger at 16.0 x 13.6 meters. The East Pagoda had a base 8.4 meters square and the West Pagoda had a base 10 meters square, indicating that the pagodas may not have been identical in height. The total area the site is about 8400 square meters. It is believed that the temple was built without roof tiles, probably because it is located in a mountainous area with heavy snowfall.  

The site is located about 38 minutes by car from Tottori Station on the JR West San'in Main Line.

See also
List of Historic Sites of Japan (Tottori)

References

External links
Tottori prefecture home page
Tottori prefecture tourist information home page
Tottori City home page

Historic Sites of Japan
Tottori (city)
Inaba Province
Asuka period
Buddhist archaeological sites in Japan